Simen Sunde Bratholm (born 4 March 1999) is a Norwegian tennis player.

Bratholm has a career high ATP singles ranking of 1357 achieved on 20 March 2017.

Bratholm has represented Norway at the Davis Cup where he has a W/L record of 1–2 in singles and 0–1 in doubles.

External links

1999 births
Living people
Norwegian male tennis players
21st-century Norwegian people